Hung Suet-nei (Chinese: 熊雪妮), known as Suet Nei or Suet Nay (Chinese: 雪妮)  is a Hong Kong actress born in 1945, Hong Kong. She is a veteran actress, having acted for many years. She has starred in martial arts Cantonese operas, due to her skill in martial arts. She signed with TVB in 1997.

Filmography

Television series

References

External links

 

TVB veteran actors
Living people
1946 births